Tommy Taylor was a British Paralympic athlete who won sixteen medals across five sports, including ten gold medals. Taylor was treated by Ludwig Guttmann after an accident in 1956 caused severe paralysis. He went on to compete at numerous Paralympic Games, finding particular success in para table tennis from Rome 1960 to Arnhem 1980. Eight of Taylor's gold medals came in table tennis, along with one in snooker and one in lawn bowls.

Paralympics
Taylor attended the first Paralympic Games in Rome in 1960, competing in the para table tennis. He won gold in both the men's singles A and, with M. Beck, the men's doubles A. His table tennis successes continued at the 1964 Games in Tokyo as he defended the titles in the reclassified A2 doubles, again with Beck, and the A2 singles against his doubles partner in the final. In Tel Aviv in 1968 Taylor lost in the quarterfinals of the singles competition but won the doubles again, this time partnered with Stephen Bradshaw. Also at these Games he entered the men's pentathlon incomplete, finishing in third place and thus securing a bronze medal.

At the 1972 Games in Heidelberg Taylor and Bradshaw lost against German competition in the semi-final, finishing in bronze medal position. Taylor did not compete for the singles title and instead entered the archery competition in a team which included fellow multiple-time Paralympian Jane Blackburn. The partnership of Taylor and Bradshaw returned to winning ways in 1976 in Toronto, while Taylor also entered and won the Men's Tournament A-C snooker.

Taylor won the Men's 1B singles table tennis competition in 1980 at the Games in Arnhem, and still competing alongside Bradshaw, beat Austria by straight sets in the doubles final to secure another gold for their country, Taylor's final Paralympic table tennis medal. Taylor found other Paralympic successes in 1980, winning medals in a fifth sport: lawn bowls. He won a bronze medal in singles competition and, alongside David Cale, won gold in the Men's Pairs 1A-1B. Taylor's final successes at the Paralympics came in 1984 in the Games jointly hosted by Stoke Mandeville and New York. Entered in the Men's Singles Tetraplegic category lawn bowls he won a bronze medal. That was equalled in the Men's Tournament Tetraplegic snooker, Taylor's second medal in the sport.

References

Year of birth missing (living people)
Paralympic gold medalists for Great Britain
Paralympic silver medalists for Great Britain
Paralympic bronze medalists for Great Britain
Place of birth missing (living people)
Living people
Medalists at the 1960 Summer Paralympics
Medalists at the 1964 Summer Paralympics
Medalists at the 1968 Summer Paralympics
Medalists at the 1972 Summer Paralympics
Medalists at the 1976 Summer Paralympics
Medalists at the 1980 Summer Paralympics
Medalists at the 1984 Summer Paralympics
Paralympic medalists in snooker
Paralympic medalists in table tennis
Paralympic medalists in archery
Paralympic medalists in lawn bowls
Paralympic medalists in athletics (track and field)
Athletes (track and field) at the 1968 Summer Paralympics
Archers at the 1972 Summer Paralympics
Snooker players at the 1976 Summer Paralympics
Lawn bowls players at the 1980 Summer Paralympics
Lawn bowls players at the 1984 Summer Paralympics
Table tennis players at the 1960 Summer Paralympics
Table tennis players at the 1964 Summer Paralympics
Table tennis players at the 1968 Summer Paralympics
Table tennis players at the 1972 Summer Paralympics
Table tennis players at the 1976 Summer Paralympics
Table tennis players at the 1980 Summer Paralympics
Paralympic athletes of Great Britain
Paralympic archers of Great Britain